is a Prefectural Natural Park on the east coast of Ōita Prefecture, Japan. Established in 1985, the park spans the municipalities of Saiki, Tsukumi, and Usuki. The park's central focus is upon the Bungo Strait.

See also
 National Parks of Japan
 Nippō Kaigan Quasi-National Park
 Setonaikai National Park

References

External links
  Maps of Bungo Suidō Prefectural Natural Park

Parks and gardens in Ōita Prefecture
Protected areas established in 1985
1985 establishments in Japan